DNA code construction refers to the application of coding theory to the design of nucleic acid systems for the field of DNA–based computation.

Introduction

DNA sequences are known to appear in the form of double helices in living cells, in which one DNA strand is hybridized to its complementary strand through a series of hydrogen bonds.  For the purpose of this entry, we shall focus on only oligonucleotides.  DNA computing involves allowing synthetic oligonucleotide strands  to hybridize in such a way as to perform computation.  DNA computing requires that the self-assembly of the oligonucleotide strands happen in such a way that hybridization should occur in a manner compatible with the goals of computation.

The field of DNA computing was established in Leonard M. Adelman's seminal paper. His work is significant for a number of reasons:

 It shows how one could use the highly parallel nature of computation performed by DNA to solve problems that are difficult or almost impossible to solve using the traditional methods.
 It's an example of computation at a molecular level, on the lines of nanocomputing, and this potentially is a major advantage as far as the information density on storage media is considered, which can never be reached by the semiconductor industry.
 It demonstrates unique aspects of DNA as a data structure.

This capability for massively parallel computation in DNA computing can be exploited in solving many computational problems on an enormously large scale such as cell-based computational systems for cancer diagnostics and treatment, and ultra-high density storage media.

This selection of codewords (sequences of DNA oligonucleotides) is a major hurdle in itself due to the phenomenon of secondary structure formation (in which DNA strands tend to fold onto themselves during hybridization and hence rendering themselves useless in further computations. This is also known as self-hybridization). The Nussinov-Jacobson algorithm is used to predict secondary structures and also to identify certain design criteria that reduce the possibility of secondary structure formation in a codeword. In essence this algorithm shows how the presence of a cyclic structure in a DNA code reduces the complexity of the problem of testing the codewords for secondary structures.

Novel constructions of such codes include using cyclic reversible extended Goppa codes, generalized Hadamard matrices, and a binary approach. Before diving into these constructions, we shall revisit certain fundamental genetic terminology.  The motivation for the theorems presented in this article, is that they concur with the Nussinov - Jacobson algorithm, in that the existence of cyclic structure helps in reducing complexity and thus prevents secondary structure formation. i.e. these algorithms satisfy some or all the design requirements for DNA oligonucleotides at the time of hybridization (which is the core of the DNA computing process) and hence do not suffer from the problems of self -  hybridization.

Definitions

A DNA code is simply a set of sequences over the alphabet .

Each purine base is the Watson-Crick complement of a unique pyrimidine base (and vice versa) – adenine and thymine form a complementary pair, as do guanine and cytosine. This pairing can be described as follows – .

Such pairing is chemically very stable and strong. However, pairing of mismatching bases does occur at times due to biological mutations.

Most of the focus on DNA coding has been on constructing large sets of DNA codewords with prescribed minimum distance properties.
For this purpose let us lay down the required groundwork to proceed further.

Let  be a word of length  over the alphabet . For , we will use the notation  to denote the subsequence .

(where  stands for reverse complement)

Another important code design consideration linked to the process of oligonucleotide hybridization pertains to the GC content of sequences in a DNA code. The GC-content, of a DNA sequence  is defined to be the number of indices  such that . A DNA code in which all codewords have the same GC-content, is called a constant GC-content code.

A generalized Hadamard matrix  is an    square matrix with entries taken from the set of th roots of unity, that satisfies  = . Here  denotes the identity matrix of order , while * stands for complex-conjugation. We will only concern ourselves with the case  for some prime . A necessary condition for the existence of generalized Hadamard matrices  is that  .

The elements of the Hadamard exponent matrix lie in the Galois field , and its row vectors constitute the codewords of what shall be called a generalized Hadamard code.

Here, the elements of  lie in the Galois field .

By definition, a generalized Hadamard matrix  in its standard form has only 1s in its first row and column. Thus, by omission of the all-zero first column cyclic generalized Hadamard codes are possible, whose codewords are the row vectors of the punctured matrix.

Property U

Vector  is said to satisfy Property U if and only if each element  of  appears in  exactly  times

The following lemma is of fundamental importance in constructing generalized Hadamard codes.

Lemma.

M sequences

Let  be an arbitrary vector of length  whose elements are in the finite field , where  is a prime. Let the elements of a vector  constitute the first period of an infinite sequence  which is periodic of period . If  is the smallest period for conceiving any subsequence, the sequence is called an M-sequence, or a maximal sequence of least period obtained by cyclically permuting  elements.
The theorems that follow present conditions that ensure M-invariance. In conjunction with a certain uniformity property of
polynomial coefficients, these conditions yield a simple method by which complex Hadamard matrices with cyclic core can be constructed.

In order to have nonzero codewords,  must be of degree .
One necessary condition for -periodicity is that , where  is monic irreducible over.
A  proof that this heuristic approach always produces a cyclic core is given below.

Examples of code construction

Code construction using complex Hadamard matrices

Construction algorithm
Moreover, Property U guarantees the nonzero codewords form a cyclic matrix, each row of period  under cyclic permutation, which serves as a cyclic core for the Hadamard matrix .
The coefficients of  indicate that  is the relative difference set, .

Theorem
Suppose the following conditions hold:

 vector  satisfies the property U, and
 , where  is a monic irreducible polynomial of degree .

Proof:

First note that  is monic and divides  with degree . Now, we need to show that the matrix  whose rows are nonzero codewords constitutes a cyclic core for some complex Hadamard matrix .

(This is because the sequence obtained by cyclically permuting  is M-invariant.)

Thus,  is the standard form of some complex Hadamard matrix .

Such a core is called a cyclic core where in each element of  appears in each row of  exactly  times, and the Hamming distance between any two rows is exactly . The  rows of the core  form a constant-composition code  - one consisting of  cyclic shifts of some length  over the set .

The following can be inferred from the theorem as explained above. (For more detailed reading, the reader is referred to the paper by Heng and Cooke.) 
Then, the  cyclic shifts of the vector  form the core of the exponent matrix of some Hadamard matrix .

Clearly  and in fact since  and no codeword in  contains no symbol , we also have .
This is summarized in the following corollary.

Corollary
For any , there exists DNA codes  with  codewords of length , constant GC-content ,  and in which every codeword is a cyclic shift of a fixed generator codeword .

;

.

Where, .

Thus, we see how DNA codes can be obtained from such generators by mapping  onto . The actual choice of mapping plays a major role in secondary structure formations in the codewords.

We see that all such mappings yield codes with essentially the same parameters. However the actual choice of mapping has a strong influence on the secondary structure of the codewords. For example, the codeword illustrated was obtained from  via the mapping , while the codeword  was obtained from the same generator  via the mapping .

Code construction via a Binary Mapping

As we can see, the first bit of a binary image clearly determines which complementary pair it belongs to.

Let  be a DNA sequence.

Now, let .

Hence, a DNA code  is a constant GC-content codeword if and only if its even component  is a constant-weight code.

Let  be a binary code consisting of  codewords of length  and minimum distance , such that  implies that .

For , consider the constant-weight subcode , where  denotes Hamming weight.
Choose  such that , and consider a DNA code, with the following choice for its even and odd components:

, .

Where  denotes lexicographic ordering. The  in the definition of  ensures that if , then , so that distinct codewords in  cannot be reverse-complements of each other.

The code  has  codewords of length  and constant weight .

Also, .

Note that  and  both have weight . This implies that  and  have weight .

.

Thus, the code  has  codewords of length .

Similarly, .

Therefore, the DNA code 

From the examples listed above, one can wonder what could be the future potential of DNA-based computers?

Despite its enormous potential, this method is highly unlikely to be implemented in home computers or even computers at offices, etc. because of the sheer flexibility and speed as well as cost factors that favor silicon chip based devices used for the computers today.

However, such a method could be used in situations where the only available method is this and requires the accuracy associated with the DNA hybridization mechanism; applications which require operations to be performed with a high degree of reliability.

Currently, there are several software packages, such as the Vienna package, which can predict secondary structure formations in single stranded DNAs (i.e. oligonucleotides) or RNA sequences.

See also
Coding theory
Bioinformatics
Biocomputers
Computational gene

References

External links
Atri Rudra's course at The State University of New York, Buffalo

DNA nanotechnology